Matthew Whelan (born 1 February 1988) is an Irish hurler who plays for Laois Senior Championship club Borris-in-Ossory/Kilcotton. He is a former member of the Laois senior hurling team.

Career

Whelan first came to Gaelic games prominence at juvenile and underage levels with the Borris-in-Ossory club, before eventually joining the club's top adult team. After the creation of the new Borris-in-Ossory/Kilcotton club, he went on to win a County Senior Championship in 2016, having earlier won three intermediate titles. Whelan first played at inter-county level as a dual player with the Laois minor teams. He won a Leinster Minor Championship title in 2005, before winning an All-Ireland Schools' Championship title in 2006. Whelan was straight out of the minor grade when he made his Laois senior hurling team debut in 2007. Over the course of the following 15 seasons, he became a first-team regular and had two spells as team captain, while he also won a Joe McDonagh Cup medal and two National League Division 2 titles. Whelan retired from inter-county hurling on 25 July 2021, having made a record number of appearances for Laois.

Career statistics

Honours

St Fergal's College
All-Ireland Senior Vocational Schools' Championship: 2006

Borris-in-Ossory
Laois Intermediate Hurling Championship: 2009

Borris-in-Ossory/Kilcotton GAA
Laois Senior Hurling Championship: 2016
Laois Intermediate Hurling Championship: 2012, 2014

Laois
Joe McDonagh Cup: 2019
National Hurling League Division 2A: 2013
National Hurling League Division 2: 2007
Leinster Minor Football Championship: 2005

Ireland
Shinty-Hurling International Series: 2015 (c)

References

1988 births
Living people
Borris-in-Ossory hurlers
Borris-in-Ossory/Kilcotton hurlers
Laois inter-county hurlers
Laois inter-county Gaelic footballers